Monck Provincial Park is a provincial park in British Columbia, Canada, located at Nicola Lake near the town of Merritt.  The park's campground is one of those which accepts reservations.  Activities including fishing, camping and hiking.  Natural features other than Nicola Lake include lava beds associated with the Chilcotin Group.

References

BC Parks webpage
Nicola Valley Travel information site

Provincial parks of British Columbia
Nicola Country
1951 establishments in British Columbia
Protected areas established in 1951